The year 1807 in science and technology involved some significant events, listed below.

Astronomy
 March 29 – H. W. Olbers discovers the asteroid which Carl Friedrich Gauss names Vesta.

Chemistry
 Potassium and sodium are isolated by Sir Humphry Davy.
 The use of fulminate in firearms is patented by Scottish clergyman Alexander John Forsyth.

Geology
  The Geological Society is founded in London; among the more prominent founders are William Babington, James Parkinson, Humphry Davy and George Bellas Greenough.

Mathematics
 William Wallace proves that any two simple polygons of equal area are equidecomposable, later known as the Bolyai–Gerwien theorem.

Medicine
 Samuel Hahnemann first introduces the term 'homeopathy' in an essay, "Indications of the Homeopathic Employment of Medicines in Ordinary Practice", published in Versammlung der Hufelandische medicinisch-chirurgischen Gesellschaft.
 British Army surgeon John Vetch describes the keratoconjunctivitis ("Egyptian ophthalmia") suffered by troops returned from service overseas; he identifies it as epidemic.

Technology
 July 20 – French brothers Claude and Nicéphore Niépce receive a patent for their Pyréolophore, an early internal combustion engine, having demonstrated it powering a boat on the Saône.
 August 17 – Robert Fulton's North River Steamboat makes her first trip from New York to Albany.
 November 19 – English inventor Lionel Lukin launches the world's first sailing self-righting rescue life-boat, the Frances Anne, at Lowestoft.
 William Cubitt patents self-regulating sails for windmills.
 Henry Maudslay patents an improved table engine.
 William Hyde Wollaston patents the camera lucida.

Zoology
 April 21 – The Tasmanian devil is first described, by George Prideaux Robert Harris.

Publications
 Alexander von Humboldt's  begins publication.
 Thomas Young's A Course of Lectures on Natural Philosophy and the Mechanical Arts published.

Awards
 Copley Medal: Everard Home

Births
 January 28 – Robert McClure, Irish-born Arctic explorer (died 1873)
 May 28 – Louis Agassiz, Swiss-born American zoologist and geologist (died 1873)
 November 14 – Auguste Laurent, French chemist (died 1853)
 November 30 – William Farr, English epidemiologist (died 1883)

Deaths
 February 27 – Louise du Pierry, French astronomer (born 1746)
 April 4 – Joseph Jérôme Lefrançais de Lalande, French astronomer (born 1732)
 December 5 – Francis Willis, English physician specialising in mental disorders (born 1718)

References

 
19th century in science
1800s in science